Leicester Riders are a British professional basketball team and the oldest club in the British Basketball League (BBL). Established in 1967, the club have played in various locations around Leicestershire before moving to their current purpose-built home venue, the Morningside Arena, in 2016.

History
The Loughborough All-Stars, as the Leicester Riders were originally known, were founded by students and lecturers at Loughborough University on 26 April 1967. They were founding members of the National Basketball League in 1972, and the British Basketball League (BBL) in 1987. They are the oldest club in the British Basketball League.

The club moved from Loughborough to Leicester in 1981, backed by Leicester City Council and Leicester City Bus (hence the change in nickname to "Riders"), before moving back to play at Loughborough University in 2000, following the closure of Granby Halls, at a new venue barely a stone's throw from Victory Hall where the club played its first game.

In 2004 the Riders agreed a sponsorship deal with De Montfort University (DMU) and moved back to Leicester, where they played their games at the DMU's John Sandford Sports Centre.

Following a difficult period for the Club financially between 2005 and 2007, former director of the team, Mike Steptoe, and the supporters club formed a consortium which raised enough money to keep the side running. Then local business Jelson Homes stepped forward to sponsor the Club and the appointment of general manager Russell Levenston began a turning point for the club. Part of the sponsorship deal with Jelson Homes was to ensure the future of the club by investing in 'basketball in the community' schemes, providing the youth of Leicester with basketball coaching programmes, such as the "Shoot to the Future" programme, run with the support of the Police.

Riders also now have an extensive youth programme for boys and girls, a Women's team near the top of England Basketball's Division One, one of the country's largest Basketball Apprentice schemes at Charnwood College, and a partnership with Loughborough University, led by the Great Britain men's captain Drew Sullivan, and which includes a GB Futures player, Jamell Anderson, two Great Britain Under 20 men's internationals and two Great Britain Under 20 women's internationals, as well as a number of boys and girls in England Under age international teams. Membership in the Club is expected to reach nearly 1,500 this season. The Club's community programmes reach nearly 15,000 young people in the City and County.

The Jelson Homes DMU Leicester Riders secured the BBL Cup in thrilling fashion as they defeated the Newcastle Eagles 80–85 at the National Indoor Arena in Birmingham on 13 January 2012, in front of a bumper 7,500 crowd, and live on Sky TV, their first piece of silverware since they won the Cup and the Playoff finals in 2001.

After winning the treble in the 2016–17 and 2017–18 season, Leicester applied for the following Basketball Champions League season. This marked the first European participation of a British team since Guildford Heat featured in the ULEB Cup in 2007. In the first qualifying round, Leicester was eliminated by Danish side Bakken Bears, thus being demoted to the season's FIBA Europe Cup, where they lost all six group stage games.

Home arenas

The team has been based at the purpose-built Morningside Arena since 2016. The £4.8 million arena, which is owned by the Leicester Riders Foundation, was officially opened in January 2016. It hosted its first game on 30 January 2016, in a quarter-final match between Leicester Riders and Surrey Scorchers in the British Basketball League Trophy, won by the Riders 77–60.

A list of all home arenas the club has had:

Victory Hall (1967–1981)
Granby Halls (1981–2000)
Sir David Wallace Centre (2000–2004)
John Sandford Centre (2004–2014)
Sir David Wallace Centre (2014–2016)
Morningside Arena (2016–present)

Season-by-season records

Honours
British Basketball League
Winners (6): 2012–13, 2015–16, 2016–17, 2017–18, 2020–21, 2021–22
Runners Up (3): 2011–12, 2014–15, 2018–19
BBL Play-offs
Winners (6): 2000–01, 2012–13, 2016–17, 2017–18, 2018–19, 2021–22
Runners Up (2) 2011–12, 2015–16
Women's British Basketball League
Runners Up (4): 2016–17, 2017–18, 2018–19, 2020–21
WBBL Play-offs
Runners Up (2): 2017–18, 2018–19
BBL Cup
Winners (3): 2012–13, 2013–14, 2021–22
Runners Up (2) 2015–16, 2022–23
WBBL Cup
Winners (1): 2020–21
Runners Up (1) 2022–23
BBL Trophy
Winners (3): 2015–16, 2016–17, 2017–18
Runners Up (4) 1991–92, 2005–06, 2012–13, 2014–15
WBBL Trophy
Winner's (3): 2017–18, 2018–19, 2019–20
Runner's Up (1): 2016–17
National Cup (predecessor of the BBL Cup)
Winners (1): 2000–01
Runner's Up (3): 1983–84, 1990–91, 1997–98

Players

Current roster

Notable players
To appear in this section a player must have either:
- Set a club record or won an individual award as a professional player.
- Played at least one official international match for his senior national team at any time.

 - Harrison Gamble 6 seasons: '13–'19
 - David Aliu 1 season: '06–'07
 - Andy Betts 1 season: '93–'94
 -Karl Brown 5 seasons: '99–'03
 - Steve Bucknall 2 seasons: '05–'07
 - Mark Hawley 2 seasons: '97–'99
 - Dave Jones 2 seasons: '00–'02
 - Nate Reinking 1 season: '06–'07
 - Robert Youngblood
  Aaron Westbrooks
  Andrew Alleyne 1 season: '06–'07
  Shawn Myers 1 season: '06–'07
  Geno Crandall
  Marty Headd
  Lonnie Legette
  Steve McGlothin 3 seasons: '00–'02, '04–'05
  Anthony McHenry 1 season: '05–'06
  Kenny Pemberton
  Billy Singleton 4 seasons: '97–'99, '00–'02
  Chris Tawiah
  John Trezvant
  Tony Windless 3 seasons: '08–'11
  Brad Wierzbicki
  Ryan Zamroz 1 season: '10–'11

See also
Leicester Riders (women)
Sport in Leicester

References

External links

 
Basketball teams established in 1967
Basketball teams in England
Sport in Leicester
1967 establishments in England
British Basketball League teams